The Fernandina Subdivision is a railroad line owned by CSX Transportation and operated by First Coast Railroad. At its north end it continues south from the Kingsland Subdivision and at its south end the track comes to an end, at a WestRock Papermill along the east coast of the Amelia River just south of the mouth of Egans Creek.

See also
 List of CSX Transportation lines

References

CSX Transportation lines
Predecessors of the Seaboard Air Line Railroad
Rail infrastructure in Florida
Transportation in Nassau County, Florida